Gonzalo Sanchez Moreno is a former football player and was the  head coach of the Bangladesh national football team. Despite his sacking after a rather unsuccessful 2018 FIFA World Cup campaign he was reappointed in March 2017 to coach the team. Andrew Ord soon replaced him.

Career
Moreno was born in Barcelona in 1972. He played as a right-back for FC Barcelona for 17 years for all categories. He was part of the first team FC Barcelona under Johan Cruyff during the 1994 UEFA Champions League Final. From 1995 to 1996 he signed for UD Almería. He rejoined FC Barcelona in 1997. He retired a year later due to a knee injury.

Coaching
In 2014, Moreno coached Madagascar's youth teams. He also won the 2014 Champion Clubs' Cup Indian Ocean with CNaPS Sports club from Madagascar. In 2016, he coached the Bangladesh national football team. Former Bangladeshi player and Bangladesh Football Federation president Kazi Salahuddin said he was impressed with his long career in FC Barcelona since the age of eight. He was taught by former Dutch legend Johan Cruyff and played with stars like Luís Figo and Pep Guardiola. Moreno also coached the Bangladesh's under-23 team with Satyajit Das Rupu. He achieved a bronze medal for Bangladesh at the 2016 South Asian Games.

He holds the UEFA A-license and is currently coaching for FC Barcelona Academy PRO, New York, US.

2018 FIFA World Cup qualification
Moreno's Bangladeshi team lost against the Jordan under Harry Redknapp. However, the Bangladeshi team had ten players sanctioned, so he had to take a team full of substitutes.

Reappointment and replacement
Moreno was appointed again to train with the team and was replaced later by Andrew Ord.

Managerial statistics

Honours
Football at the Indian Ocean Island Games
 Champion 2014  with CNaPS Sports  
South Asian Games
Bronze medal (1): 2016

References

1972 births
Living people
People from Barcelona
Spanish footballers
Association football goalkeepers
Association football defenders
FC Barcelona players
Bangladesh national football team managers
Expatriate football managers in Bangladesh